Incoherence may refer to:
Lack of Coherence (disambiguation)
The Incoherence of the Incoherence (Arabic: تهافت التهافت Tahāfut al-Tahāfut) by Ibn Rushd (Averroes) (1126–1198)
The Incoherence of the Philosophers (تهافت الفلاسفة Tahāfut al-Falāsifaʰ in Arabic) 
Incoherence (2006–2010), professional wrestling tag team of Hallowicked, Delirious and Frightmare
Incoherence (album), an album by Peter Hammill